Anton Bukhanko is a Russian professional ice hockey defenceman who currently plays for Metallurg Magnitogorsk of the Kontinental Hockey League (KHL).

References

Living people
1986 births
Metallurg Magnitogorsk players
Russian ice hockey defencemen